The Găiceana is a right tributary of the river Berheci in Romania. It discharges into the Berheci in Dealu Morii.

References

Rivers of Romania
Rivers of Bacău County